Boca Chica Key is an island in the lower Florida Keys, about a mile east of the island of Key West at its closest point. Its name is Spanish for "small mouth". It is mostly covered by salt marshes and mangrove trees, and is the home of the largest Naval Air Station (NAS Key West) in south Florida. U.S. 1, the Overseas Highway, crosses the key at approximately mile markers 6.5—8, east of Key West., near the NAS and Boca Chica Beach (aka Geiger Beach) on Boca Chica Road.

References

Islands of Monroe County, Florida
Unincorporated communities in Monroe County, Florida
Suburbs of Key West
Beaches of Monroe County, Florida
Landforms of Monroe County, Florida
Wetlands of Florida
Islands of the Florida Keys
Beaches of Florida
Unincorporated communities in Florida
Islands of Florida